The West Shore Railroad was the final name of a railroad that ran from Weehawken, New Jersey, on the west bank of the Hudson River opposite New York City, north  to Albany, New York, and then west to Buffalo.  It was organized as a competitor to the New York Central and Hudson River Railroad, but was soon taken over by that company.

History

The first part of the line was built as the Saratoga and Hudson River Railroad, incorporated April 16, 1864 and opened in spring 1866. After only about a year of independent operation, the line served as a branch of the New York Central Railroad (NYC), splitting at Athens Junction near Schenectady and running southeast and south along the west side of the Hudson River to Athens, New York. Early plans included acquiring the Saratoga and Schenectady Railroad as a northern extension. The Saratoga and Hudson River was bought and merged into the New York Central as its Athens Branch on September 9, 1867.

The terminal at Athens was destroyed by fire in 1876. The line ran intermittently from then into the 1880s, with its tracks being torn up for good in 1888. It had been called the "White Elephant" Railroad for most of its existence because it quickly outlived whatever usefulness it may have had. Today,  a row of brick houses known as the Brick Row Historic District, which was built in 1850 for the workers of the failed railroad, stand in Athens as the only remaining structure related to the "White Elephant" Railroad project.

At the south end of the route, the Ridgefield Park Railroad was incorporated April 4, 1867. This was planned as a branch of the New Jersey Rail Road, splitting at Marion Junction and running north on the west side of the New Jersey Palisades via Ridgefield Park to the state line at Tappan, New York.

Across the state line, the Rockland Central Railroad was incorporated on May 23, 1870, to continue the line to Haverstraw, and the Rockland Central Extension Railroad, incorporated May 29, 1872, was to continue farther north along the west side of the Hudson River. The Rockland Central and Rockland Central Extension merged on July 29, 1872, to form a new Rockland Central Railroad, and that company merged with the Ridgefield Park to form the Jersey City and Albany Railroad on June 24, 1873, with the intention of building a full line from Jersey City to Albany.

The line first opened in 1872 as a spur of the New Jersey Midland Railway, which had built the section south of Ridgefield Park. At that time, the northern terminus was at Tappan; the extension north to Haverstraw, New York opened in 1879.

Bankruptcy struck soon, and the New York section of the line was sold on September 28, 1877, and reorganized on October 12, 1878, as the Jersey City and Albany Railway. The part in New Jersey was sold on August 17, 1878, and reorganized with the same name, and the two companies merged in January 1879 to form a consolidated Jersey City and Albany Railway.

The North River Railway was incorporated on April 3, 1880, to extend the line north to Albany, with a branch to Schenectady and a connection to the New York, Ontario and Western Railway (O&W) at Cornwall, New York. The North River Railway was consolidated with the Jersey City and Albany on May 5, 1881, to form the North River Railroad, again forming a single planned line between Jersey City and Albany.

The Hudson River West Shore Railroad was incorporated on February 16, 1867, and the West Shore Hudson River Railroad was incorporated on October 28, 1867, absorbing the Hudson River West Shore on February 16, 1867. This was a second proposed line on the west shore of the river from New Jersey to Albany. The New York, West Shore and Chicago Railroad was incorporated July 13, 1870 and absorbed the West Shore Hudson River on July 21, 1877, with a planned line not only to Albany but then west along the south bank of the Mohawk River to Buffalo. That company was sold and reorganized as the New York, West Shore and Buffalo Railway on February 18, 1880, and on June 14, 1881, the North River Railroad was merged into it, forming one company in charge of the whole route from New Jersey to Buffalo.

In 1883, the newly-formed company inaugurated service between Newburgh and Jersey City, at the Pennsylvania Railroad Depot, where passengers transferred to ferries across the river.

A new alignment was built along the east side of the New York, Susquehanna and Western Railway (formerly the New Jersey Midland) to North Bergen. By 1886, service operated to Weehawken Terminal through a tunnel under Bergen Hill that had been built in the three preceding years.

The company leased the Athens Branch of the New York Central and Hudson River Railroad, the old Saratoga and Hudson River Railroad, and incorporated it into its main line between Coxsackie and Fullers. At Ravena, along the Athens Branch, the main line turned northwest towards Schenectady, while a new branch continued north to Kenwood Junction on the Albany and Susquehanna Railroad in Albany. This full line formed an immediate threat to the NYC monopoly.

In addition to its owned trackage, the West Shore (WS) also had trackage rights over the Suspension Bridge and Erie Junction Railroad and Erie International Railroad, providing a route from Buffalo to Ontario. After the New York Central took over the West Shore this was useless, as the New York Central had a parallel line, the Buffalo and Niagara Falls Railroad.

The West Shore also had relations with the Boston, Hoosac Tunnel and Western Railway (BHT&W), which would have run from the Hoosac Tunnel in Massachusetts west to Buffalo. Instead the BHT&W built only to Rotterdam Junction, west of Schenectady; it was later taken over by the Fitchburg Railroad and, after that, by the Boston and Maine Railroad.

In 1881, the WS had been planned as a link in a new cross-country line from New York to San Francisco, using the Nickel Plate Road, Chicago, Milwaukee and St. Paul Railway, Northern Pacific Railroad and Oregon Navigation Company.  However, William Henry Vanderbilt of the NYC bought the Nickel Plate in 1882, killing that plan. The NYC then proceeded to drive the New York, West Shore and Buffalo into bankruptcy via a brutal rate-war that the WS could not financially withstand

The Pennsylvania Railroad (PRR) recognized that the WS would make a great addition to its system, allowing it to penetrate deep into NYC territory. At the same time, the NYC was building the South Pennsylvania Railroad across southern Pennsylvania: deep in the Pennsylvania Railroad's territory. A destructive rate-war loomed, which was anathema to top railroad financier J.P. Morgan. His personal intervention with these two railroads' presidents, aboard his steam yacht "Corsair" in New York Harbor, forced the PRR and NYC railroads into an agreement under which the NYC would buy the WS and stop building the South Pennsylvania (sections of which were reused much later for the Pennsylvania Turnpike, in 1940.) The NYC bought the New York, West Shore and Buffalo Railway on November 24, 1885, and reorganized its 
new acquisition as the West Shore Railroad on December 5, leasing it for 475 years from January 1, 1886.

In many sections, the WS ran on a straighter path than the NYC, and was thus used for through freight. For instance, between Oneida and Utica, the WS followed the general line of the never-built Syracuse and Utica Direct Railroad, which had been merged into the NYC.

Named trains and route stations

Several named trains traveled north from Weehawken to Albany including the Storm King Limited and the West Pointer.

Main stops between Albany Union Station and Weehawken Terminal included Ravena, Coxsackie, Catskill, Saugerties, Kingston, Highland, Marlboro, Newburgh, Cornwall, West Point, Haverstraw, Congers, West Nyack, Orangeburg and Tappan, all in New York, and Dumont, Teaneck, Bogota and Ridgefield Park in New Jersey.

Station gallery

Current use
Passenger service on the line ended to Albany in 1958 and to West Haverstraw in 1959, ending direct New York Central passenger train service on the west side of the Hudson River. The line became part of Penn Central in 1968, and passed to Conrail in 1976 after Penn Central's 1970 bankruptcy. When Conrail was divided between CSX Transportation and Norfolk Southern, in 1999, the West Shore Railroad, along with most of the old New York Central lines, became part of CSX.

It became CSX's River Subdivision, which begins west of the Hudson Palisades at North Bergen Yard in Hudson County, New Jersey. Proceeding north it passes through Bergen County and Rockland County, New York, and up the west side of the Hudson River to Selkirk Yard, from which there are connections to points west and east. South of North Bergen Yard it connects to the Northern Running Track, part of Conrail. The tunnel under the Palisades is part of the Hudson Bergen Light Rail which emerges at the Hudson Waterfront at Weehawken Port Imperial.

West Shore Regional Proposal
Throughout the late 1980s and early 1990s, New Jersey Transit, the main provider of contemporary rail and bus service in the locale, expressed interest in potentially restoring passenger service to the line due to ever-increasing ridership on the local bus lines.

In 1997, a $3.97 million grant was given to New Jersey Transit by the Federal Transit Administration. At the time, many towns along the line supported the idea, and went as far as conducting zoning procedures to allow room for the new additions the railroad would bring. Considering the current line is not under proprietorship of New Jersey Transit, a new right-of-way would be installed parallel to the existing freight line.

However, funding remained an issue, as did disagreement with CSX. Ultimately, focus on the project was dropped in favor of progress on the Northern Branch Corridor Project and Meadowlands Rail Line (completed in 2009). An official status on the project has not since been noted.

See also

 Highland Falls station
 Kingston, New York railroad stations
 Milton station (New York)
 Weehawken Terminal

References

Bibliography

External links

 Railroad History Database
 The New York, West Shore and Buffalo
 New York Central Historical Information
 West Shore Railroad
 Existing Railroad Stations in New York State

Predecessors of the New York Central Railroad
Defunct New Jersey railroads
Defunct New York (state) railroads
Erie Canal
Hudson River
Railway companies established in 1885
Railway companies disestablished in 1952
Subdivisions of the New York Central Railroad
Weehawken, New Jersey
Transportation in Hudson County, New Jersey
Transportation in Rockland County, New York
Defunct railroads in Syracuse, New York
Railroads controlled by the Vanderbilt family
Rail lines in Rockland County, New York